HMS Wintringham (M2777/IMS77) was a  for the Royal Navy. Their names were all chosen from villages ending in -ham. The minesweeper was named after Wintringham.

She remained in operational reserve in a land cradle at Rosneath on the Clyde until 1963.  She was transferred to the Royal Australian Navy on 9 June 1966, arriving in Sydney as deck cargo on the merchant ship Gladstone Star on 29 July 1968. She was converted into a diving tender by Halvorsens, renamed HMAS Seal (DTV1001/Y298) and entered service in December 1968.

Seal was decommissioned in 1988, sold into civilian service on 29 November 1989, and converted into the corporate luxury yacht TSMV Seal. Seal was holed while at sea off the Western Australian coast and was then purposely run aground at Hidden Island, Western Australia on 1 May 2003.

References

 Blackman, R.V.B. ed. Jane's Fighting Ships (1953)

Ham-class minesweepers
Ships built on the Isle of Wight
1955 ships
Cold War minesweepers of the United Kingdom
Royal Navy ship names